Jonathan Edwards "Jack" Ingersoll (February 24, 1889 – May 26, 1967) was an American football player and coach. He served as the head coach at Colgate University in 1911 and at Virginia Agricultural and Mechanical College and Polytechnic Institute (VPI)—now known as Virginia Tech—in 1916, compiling a career college football record of 10–8.  Ingersoll was the 16th head football coach for the Colgate University Raiders located in the Village of Hamilton in Madison County, New York and he held that position for the 1911 season.  His coaching record at Colgate was 3–6 . He died in 1967.

Head coaching record

References

1889 births
1967 deaths
American football quarterbacks
Colgate Raiders football coaches
Dartmouth Big Green football players
Virginia Tech Hokies football coaches
Sportspeople from Cleveland
Coaches of American football from Ohio
Players of American football from Cleveland